Eosamon is a genus of freshwater crabs in the subfamily Potamiscinae, found in East and South-East Asia.

Species
 Eosamon boonyaratae (Naiyanetr, 1987)
 Eosamon brousmichei (Rathbun, 1904): Vietnam
 Eosamon hafniense (Bott, 1966)
 Eosamon lushuiense (Dai & G.-X. Chen, 1985)
 Eosamon nominathuis Yeo, 2010
 Eosamon paludosum (Rathbun, 1904)
 Eosamon phuphanense (Naiyanetr, 1992)
 Eosamon smithianum (Kemp, 1923)
 Eosamon tengchongense (Dai & G.-X. Chen, 1985)
 Eosamon tumidum (Wood-Mason, 1871)
 Eosamon yotdomense (Naiyanetr, 1984)

References

External links

Potamoidea
Freshwater crustaceans of Asia